The 2011–12 season was the 112th season in Società Sportiva Lazio's history and their 24th consecutive season in the top-flight of Italian football.

Pre-season
During the pre-season, Lazio purchased Djibril Cissé from Panathinaikos, Miroslav Klose from Bayern Munich, Abdoulay Konko from Genoa, Lorik Cana from Galatasaray and Senad Lulić from Young Boys. They also sold Stephan Lichtsteiner to Juventus for €10 million and purchased goalkeeper Federico Marchetti from Cagliari. They then sold goalkeeper Fernando Muslera to Galatasaray.

Current squad
.

Transfers

In

Out

Competitions

Serie A

League table

Results summary

Results by round

Matches

Coppa Italia

UEFA Europa League

Play-off round

Having qualified for the Europa League play-off round in the previous Serie A campaign, Lazio played a double-legged match for their chance to enter the Europa League. On 5 August 2011, Lazio drew Macedonian side FK Rabotnički, a team who has survived since the first qualifying round, earning them World's Club Team of the Month for July 2011.

Group stage

Notes
Note 3: Vaslui played their home matches at Stadionul Ceahlăul, Piatra Neamţ as their own Stadionul Municipal did not meet UEFA criteria.

Knockout phase

Round of 32

Squad statistics

Statistics accurate as of match played 23 February 2012

References

2011-12
Italian football clubs 2011–12 season
2011–12 UEFA Europa League participants seasons